Damaged is a split EP by Japanese bands Boris and Stupid Babies Go Mad. It was released in 2007 by Diwphalanx Records as a picture disc on 10″ vinyl and limited to 1500 copies. The release also comes with a DVD. The cover features a homage to the classic Black Flag logo and takes its name from Black Flag's debut album Damaged. Both bands cover each other's songs for this release (Stupid Babies Go Mad covers "Ibitsu" and another song twice while Boris covers "Double Vision").

This release also came with a bonus DVD which features live footage of both bands. Stupid Babies Go Mad's live footage is done with a stark black-and-white look while Boris' part has bizarre cut-offs and camera manipulations, although by the second half of their part it's left alone.

"Evil Stack" is the first iteration released in a series of drone improvisations using the title. The second appears on Rock Dream, while the third is included on Präparat.

Track listings

10″
Side A: Stupid Babies Go Mad - "Damaged 4" - 7:52
Side B: Boris - "Damaged 3" - 8:55
*Each song features a locked groove at the end, looping a small snippet of the song ad infinitum, playing on the "Damaged" theme. The song length is taken based on when the loop goes around in one revolution.

DVD
 Boris - "Evil Stack"
 Stupid Babies Go Mad - "Evilive"
 Stupid Babies Go Mad - 侵入
 Stupid Babies Go Mad - "Spiral"
 Stupid Babies Go Mad - "Kiss Me"
 Stupid Babies Go Mad - "Stifle Away"
 Stupid Babies Go Mad - "Nervous Break Down"
 Stupid Babies Go Mad - "Under Cover"
 Stupid Babies Go Mad - "Visious Love"
 Stupid Babies Go Mad - "Double Vision"
 Stupid Babies Go Mad - "Violent Hitman"
 Boris - "Blackout"
 Boris - "Pink"
 Boris - "Woman on the Screen"
 Boris - "Nothing Special"
 Boris - "Ibitsu"
 Boris - "Death Valley"
 Boris - "A Bao A Qu"
 Boris - "Akuma no Uta"
 Boris - "Electric"
 Boris - "Dyna-Soar"

Pressing history

References

2007 EPs
Boris (band) EPs